Below is a list of dishes found in German cuisine.

Famous dishes

Baden-Württemberg

Bavaria

Berlin

Bremen and Lower Saxony

East Prussia

East Prussia, as Germany's easternmost province, was very often influenced by the cuisines of its surrounding neighbours: Russia and Lithuania to the northeast, and Poland to the south. The Russian borscht was adapted to the East Prussian palate, and Polish sausages were frequently found on the dinner table.

East Prussia's gastronomy also made extensive use of the abundant products from its dark, remote forests. Honey was often incorporated into recipes, and Kopskiekelwein, a fruit wine made from wild currants, was the favourite regional tipple alongside beer.

Franconia

Frankfurt am Main and Hessen

Hamburg

Mecklenburg-Vorpommern

Palatinate

Rhineland

Saarland

Saxony

Note: The cuisine of the Saxon part of the Ore Mountains is more a relative of the cuisine of Franconia than a relative of the other parts of Saxony. The cuisine of Upper Lusatia also differs from central Saxony and is more related to the (former) cuisines of Lower Silesia and Northern Bohemia.

Saxony-Anhalt 

Typical for very traditional dishes from Saxony-Anhalt is the combination of bitter or hearty meat dish with sweet. Sweet pancakes in Green bean soup for example are the cause of many jokes.

Schleswig-Holstein

Silesia 

When Silesia was German, the influence of neighboring countries was clear in Silesian cooking; Polish carp and cheeses, Bohemian goulash, Austrian sausage and Pfefferkuchen (pepper cakes). Schnapps was very commonly drunk with beer in Silesia. There was an old saying that went "Silesia has two principal rivers, Schnapps and the river Oder".

Thuringia

Westphalia

See also

 German cuisine
 German fries
 List of German cheeses
 List of German desserts
 List of German soups

References 

Dishes